Steve, Stephen or Steven Gray may refer to:

Sports
 Steve Gray (basketball), American basketball player for Saint Mary's College
 Steven Gray (basketball, born 1989), American
 Steve Gray (racing driver) (born 1956), retired NASCAR Cup Series driver
 Steve Gray (rugby union) (born 1963), Canadian rugby union player
 Steven Gray (footballer) (born 1981), Irish footballer
 Stevie Gray (1967–2009), Scottish footballer
 Stephen Gray (cricketer) (born 1988), English cricketer

Other
 Stephen Grey (born 1968), British journalist
 Stephen Gray (scientist) (1666–1736), English scientist
 Stephen Gray (musical administrator) (1923–2012), English musical administrator
 Stephen Gray (writer) (born 1941), South African writer
 Steve Gray (musician) (1944–2008), English pianist, composer, and arranger
 Steve Gray (TV presenter) (born 1965), New Zealand TV presenter and blogger
 Steven Gray (American journalist), American writer, editor, and producer
 Adyashanti (Steven Gray, born 1962), American spiritual teacher